Gulshan-e-Sheraz is one of the neighbourhoods of Gadap Town in Karachi, Sindh, Pakistan.

There are several ethnic groups in Gulshan-e-Sheraz including Muhajirs, Sindhis, Punjabis, Kashmiris, Seraikis, Pakhtuns, Balochis, Memons, Bohras,  Ismailis, etc. Over 99% of the population is Muslim. The population of Gadap Town is estimated to be nearly one million.

See also 
 Ahsanabad
 Darsano Chana
 Gabol Town
 Gadap
 Gujro
 Gulshan-e-Maymar
 Gadap Town
 Khuda Ki Basti
 Manghopir Hills
 Manghopir
 Maymarabad
 Murad Memon Goth
 Songal
 Surjani Town
 Yousuf Goth
 Sohrab Goth

References

Neighbourhoods of Karachi